Biznes & Baltiya was a business newspaper published in Latvia.

References

Business newspapers
Defunct newspapers published in Latvia
Defunct daily newspapers
Russian-language newspapers published in Latvia
Mass media in Riga
Business in Latvia
1991 establishments in Latvia
Publications established in 1991
2014 disestablishments in Latvia
Publications disestablished in 2014